Mont Margériaz is a mountain of Savoie, France. It lies in the Bauges range.

Mountains of the Alps
Mountains of Savoie